

Events
February 27 – Robert Schumann unsuccessfully attempts suicide by throwing himself from a bridge into the River Rhine.
June 13 – Anthony Faas patents the 1st US accordion, having made improvements to both the keyboard, and to enhance the sound (11,062). US patent No.US11062A
Anton Rubinstein begins a four-year concert tour of Europe, establishing his reputation as the leading piano virtuoso of his generation.
Richard Wagner completes Das Rheingold.

Published popular music
 "Hard Times Come Again No More" w.m. Stephen Collins Foster
 "(I Dream of) Jeanie With the Light Brown Hair" w.m. Stephen Collins Foster
 "Maggie by My Side" Stephen Collins Foster
 "Old Dog Tray" Stephen Collins Foster
 "What Is Home Without A Mother" w.m. Septimus Winner
 "Willie We Have Missed You" Stephen Collins Foster

Classical music
Hector Berlioz – L'enfance du Christ
Charles Gounod – Chant de paix
Franz Liszt – Les préludes
Henri Wieniawski – Le carnaval russe for violin and piano
Johannes Brahms
Piano Trio No. 1, Op. 8 (revised in 1889)
Variations on a Theme by Robert Schumann in F-sharp minor, Op. 9, for piano. The theme is from Op. 99, Bunte Blätter.
Ballades, Op. 10
Fourteen Variations on a Hungarian Melody, in D major, Op. 21 No. 2 
Charles Sandys Packer – "City of Sydney Polka"

Opera
Karel Miry – La Lanterne magique (opera in 3 acts, libretto by Hippoliet van Peene, premiered on March 10 in Ghent)
Franz Schubert – Alfonso und Estrella (premiered June 24 by Franz Liszt in Weimar, thirty-two years after it was composed)

Births
January 21 – Georges Ernest Street, composer (died 1908)
January 31 – William Hall Sherwood, composer (died 1911)
February 5 – Laura Emeline Newell, hymnist and songwriter (died 1916)
March 10 – Dolores Paterno, composer (died 1881)
March 14 – Fred Whishaw, musician (died 1934)
April 13 
António D'Andrade, opera singer (d. 1942)
William Henry Drummond, lyricist (died 1907)
April 30 – Alexandre Rey Colaço, pianist (died 1928)
May 1 – Percy French, songwriter (died 1920)
May 5 – Antonio Smareglia, composer (died 1929)
May 6 – Laura Joyce Bell, contralto singer and actress (d. 1904)
May 13 – Paul Klengel, violinist (died 1935)
May 15 – Pavel Pabst, pianist (died 1897)
May 17 – Georges Gillet, oboist (died 1920)
May 18 – Bernard Zweers, composer (died 1924)
June 14 – Frederik Rung, composer (died 1914)
June 19 – Alfredo Catalani, composer (died 1893)
June 27 – Ladislao Bonus, Filipino composer (died 1908)
July 3 – Leoš Janáček, composer (d. 1928)
July 10 – John Lloyd Williams, musician (died 1945)
July 14 – Alexander Kopylov, violinist and composer (d. 1911)
August 23 – Moritz Moszkowski, composer (died 1925)
August 24 – Alfred Dudley Turner, composer (some sources have b.1853) (d.1888) 
October 16 – Oscar Wilde, poet and lyricist (died 1900) 
October 22 – James A. Bland, minstrel performer (died 1911) 
October 30 – Julie Rivé-King, pianist (died 1937) 
September 1 – Engelbert Humperdinck, composer (d. 1921)
September 22 – Ovide Musin, violinist (died 1929)
November 1 – W. Paris Chambers, composer (died 1913)
November 6 – John Philip Sousa, composer (d. 1932)
November 14 – Dina Edling, opera singer (d. 1935)

Deaths
January 12 – Philip Klitz, composer (born 1805)
February 4 – Iwan Müller, clarinetist (born 1786)
March 3 – Giovanni Battista Rubini, operatic tenor (born 1794)
March 26 – Emilie Hammarskjöld, pianist, singer and composer (born 1821)
April 18 – Józef Elsner, composer and teacher (born 1769)
April 30 – James Montgomery, hymnist (born 1771)
May 1 – Jean Coralli, dancer and choreographer (born 1779)
May 3 – William Beale, composer (born 1784)
May 18 – Henry Lemoine, composer and music publisher (born 1786)
May 31 – Vatroslav Lisinski, composer (born 1819)
June 17 – Henriette Sontag, operatic soprano (born 1806) (cholera)
July 14 – Louis-Pierre Norblin, cellist (born 1781)
August 21 – August Ferdinand Anacker, composer (born 1790)
October – Luigi Tarisio, violin dealer and collector (born c. 1790)
November 2 – Anton Pann, poet, musicologist and composer (born c. 1790)
November 17 – Alberich Zwyssig, composer of the Swiss national anthem (born 1808)

References 

 
19th century in music
Music by year